Bayda Governorate (Bayda Governorate) was one of the governorates (muhafazah) of Libya from 1963 to 1969. Its capital was Bayda.Other important towns in the governorate were Marj, Al Qubah, Shahhat and Apollonia. It was created out of the Cyrenaica province. 

On 23 May 1971, the governorate was renamed Jabal al Akhdar Governorate, but the boundaries remained unchanged. The governorate's population was 131,940 in 1963.
Darnah Governorate - east
Benghazi Governorate - west

See also
 Jabal al Akhdar District

Notes

Governorates of Libya